100 Pipers is a brand of blended Scotch whisky produced by Pernod Ricard India Private Ltd..

100 Pipers is bottled and marketed in India. 100 Pipers is a blend of between 25 and 30 source whiskies that came from Scotland. Much of it comes from the Allt a'Bhainne distillery, which is also owned by Pernod Ricard and does not have its own bottling facilities.

In addition to India, it is also distributed in Thailand, other Asian countries and South America. The company says it is the "No. 2 standard whisky in Asia", and the "No. 1 standard whisky" in Thailand.

History

The brand owes its name and Celtic imagery to the Scottish tradition of bagpipers leading soldiers into battle. The "100 Pipers" name in particular comes from the ballad of "The Hundred Pipers", which tells of the heroic Bonnie Prince Charlie's (1720–1788) 1745 Jacobite uprising led by a troop of 100 bagpipers.

Marketing and market presence
The brand is marketed with the promotional slogan True Legend.

The website RankingtheBrands.com rated the brand value of 100 Pipers 75th in 2011 and 81st in 2014 among 10,000 spirit brands worldwide.

India

100 Pipers sponsors an annual "India Music Week" festival.

Thailand
100 Pipers is one of the best-selling whiskies in Thailand. A limited-edition "Night Bottle" for 100 Pipers was released in Thailand in 2015 with a fashion show-themed silicone wrap accompanying the bottle design.

Awards
100 Pipers received a Gold Medal at "The Asian Spirits Masters 2014".

References

Alcoholic drink brands
Seagram
Pernod Ricard brands